The smc Pentax-DA* 55mm f/1.4 SDM lens is a professional prime lens for the Pentax K-mount.  It is designed for portrait use with a 35mm equivalent focal length of 82.5mm.  The lens features weather sealing, an SDM ultrasonic motor for quiet autofocus, and has 9 rounded diaphragm blades for smoother bokeh.  Autofocus speed is similar to an equivalent screwdrive lens.

References

External links

SMC Pentax-DA* 55mm f/1.4 SDM
Bojidar Dimitrov's Pentax K-Mount Page: DA* 55/1.4 SDM

55
Camera lenses introduced in 2008